Peter Wackel (born Steffen Peter Haas on 4 January 1977 in Erlangen) is a German singer.

Life
Wackel sings German Schlager songs. He is very popular in Mallorca. Wackel is also a big hit in the German city of Dusseldorf and is often played in their biggest night time hot spot Anton's.

Discography
Albums
 1999: Jetzt wackelts im Karton
 2000: Liebe, Sünde Leidenschaft
 2001: Wackelkontakt
 2003: Livealbum
 2006: Wackel Peter – Das Best of Peter Wackel Album
 2008: Wackel Total!
 2009: DVD 11 Jahre Peter Wackel

Singles
 1998: Vier (nachts stand ich vor ihr)
 1999: Party, Palmen, Weiber und 'n Bier
 2001: I’ve Had the Time of My Life (with Sharon Williams)
 2003: So schmeckt der Sommer
 2004: Nüchtern bin ich so schüchtern
 2005: Das Lied über mich (featuring Power Wuschel)
 2006: Ladioo
 2007: Ü30
 2007: Joana (Du geile Sau) / Heimweh nach der Insel (featuring Chriss Tuxi)
 2008: Joana Mallorca at live Version (featuring Chriss Tuxi)
 2008: Manchmal möchte ich schon mit dir … (with Chriss Tuxi)
 2009: In den Bergen ist's am Besten / Auf Mallorca ist's am Besten
 2009: Kenn nicht deinen Namen – scheißegal (Besoffen)
 2009: Eviva Espana
 2010: Kenn jetzt deinen Namen (Schabracke)
 2010: Es gibt nur ein Gas – Vollgas
 2010: Elvira ist schwanger
 2010: Deutschlaaand Deutschlaaand
 2011: Woochenende!
 2011: Bye bye Belinda
 2012: Ich kauf mir lieber einen Tirolerhut
 2012: Bongiorno (feat. Ikke Hüftgold & Lena Nitro)
 2012: Alt wie ein Baum
 2012: Heute Nacht geht es ab (with Klaus & Klaus)
 2013: Erika (Komm mit mir nach Amerika)
 2013: Scheiß drauf! Mallorca ist nur einmal im Jahr
 2013: Bier her

References

External links

 website by Peter Wackel
 Peter Wackel at IMDb

1977 births
Living people
Schlager musicians
People from Erlangen
21st-century German male  singers